Anna Leonidovna Khachiyan (Armenian: Աննա Խաչիյան, born August 23, 1985), is a Russian-American cultural critic, writer, and co-host of the podcast Red Scare based in New York City.

Early life 
Khachiyan was born in Moscow, USSR, in 1985. In 1990, she immigrated to the United States with her parents and was raised in New Jersey. She is the daughter of the Soviet mathematician and Rutgers University professor Leonid Khachiyan and Olga Pischikova Reynberg. She is of Armenian and Jewish descent.

Khachiyan received the Patrick J. Quigley memorial scholarship from Rutgers University in 2006, studying economics and art history and graduating with honors. She went on to pursue a master's degree in art history at New York University, as well as a PhD in Soviet architecture, completing the former and dropping out of the latter.

Before Red Scare, Khachiyan worked odd jobs as a restaurant hostess, illustrator and actress.

Career 
On March 29, 2018, Khachiyan started the cultural commentary podcast Red Scare, with co-host and actress Dasha Nekrasova. The show has been associated with both the dirtbag left and the new right as well as the subculture surrounding Dimes Square. It covers current topics in American culture and politics in both a comedic and serious tone. 

Khachiyan's commentary and critique of neoliberalism and feminism are heavily influenced by historian Christopher Lasch and social critic Camille Paglia. She has also been influenced by Mark Fisher  and Michel Houellebecq.

Khachiyan has been interviewed by Eric Weinstein and by Bret Easton Ellis on their respective podcasts. She has also appeared on i24NEWS to discuss Russian-born convicted fraudster Anna Delvey, and as a speaker as part of Art Toronto's PLATFORM Speak Series.

Personal life 
Khachiyan is dating Jewish-American percussionist and visual artist Eli Keszler.
On the February 13, 2021 episode of The Tim Dillon Show, Khachiyan announced she was eight months pregnant. Her son was born on March 28, 2021.

Filmography

References 

Living people
1985 births
American podcasters
Women podcasters
Russian emigrants to the United States
American people of Armenian descent
American people of Russian-Jewish descent
American feminist writers
Female critics of feminism
Feminist critics of feminism